Datuk Mohd Nasir bin Ibrahim Fikri (born 4 March 1957) was a Member of the Parliament of Malaysia. He was elected to the Parliament for the Kuala Nerus constituency in Terengganu in 2008, as a member of the United Malays National Organisation (UMNO) party in the ruling Barisan Nasional coalition. He was defeated for re-election in 2013 by 610 votes. The seat fell to Mohd Khairuddin Aman Razali of the Pan-Malaysian Islamic Party (PAS).

Before entering federal politics, Mohd Nasir was a member of the State Assembly of Terengganu and served on the state's Executive Council.

Election results

Honours
 :
 Officer of the Order of the Defender of the Realm (KMN) (2003)
 Commander of the Order of Meritorious Service (PJN) – Datuk (2010)
 :
 Knight Commander of the Order of the Crown of Terengganu (DPMT) – Dato' (2005)

References

Living people
1957 births
People from Terengganu
Members of the Dewan Rakyat
United Malays National Organisation politicians
Malaysian people of Malay descent
Malaysian Muslims
Members of the Terengganu State Legislative Assembly
Officers of the Order of the Defender of the Realm
Commanders of the Order of Meritorious Service
Knights Commander of the Order of the Crown of Terengganu